The 1968 Bartın earthquake occurred at 10:19:56 on September 3 with a moment magnitude of 6.3 and a maximum Mercalli Intensity of VIII (Severe). The shock resulted in 24 to 29 deaths and 200 injuries.

See also
 List of earthquakes in 1968
 List of earthquakes in Turkey

References

1968 earthquakes
Earthquakes in Turkey
Tsunamis in Turkey